Ashin Thittila or Seṭṭhilābhivaṃsa, commonly known as U Thittila, was a Burmese Theravada Buddhist monk, who was also a distinguished and brilliant scholar of Buddhist literature (Pariyatti) and meditation teacher (Patipatta). He is said to be the first religious worker among the Burmese monks left for a foreign country to do Buddhist missionary work by living there for long years, to be exact, 14 consecutive years in England.

He served as a lecturer on Buddhist philosophy known as Abhidhamma at the University of Yangon, took part in compiling the Burmese-English dictionary, jointly working with Dr. Hla Pe, and wrote a few books in English and Myanmar. He is the one who translated Vibhaṅga, the second part of Abhidhamma Pitaka, from Pali to English for the first time. He also worked as a librarian at Adyar Library of Theosophical Society Adyar and the library at Buddhist Society in London.

He could give inspiration and brought many other Buddhist monks from Myanmar to a new level of Buddhist missionary work around the world. He travelled throughout the world to do a great number of talks on Buddhist teachings, particularly Abhidhamma, at a variety of universities and events.

Biography

Youth 
He was born in 1896, in Badigon village, Pyawbwe Township in Myanmar, to parents, U Aye and Daw Htwe, who earned their living as farmers. Mg Khin, as his birth name, at the age of seven, would go to the village monastery called Badigon Vihara, where he learnt some Buddhist scriptures from the abbot Sayadaw U Kavinda. His teacher U Kavinda took him to Mandalay to be made aware of a sermon on Abhidhamma. Afterwards he made up his mind to enter the monkhood.

Monkhood and learning 
When he reached fifteen, he was ordained a novice (samanera) and had already known a few Buddhist Suttas and other scriptures well and truly. In 1916, his full ordination occurred in Mawlamyine, under Sayadaw U Okkantha as his preceptor.

Before his full ordination, he had studied hard under the guidance of Sayadaw Ashin Adiccavamsa, a distinguished scholar lecturing at Masoyein monastery in Mandalay by then. He succeeded in holding the Pathamagyaw title in 1918, after he ranked first in the Pathamagyi examination. In 1923, he passed the Sakyasīha examination held by  the Pariyattisasanahita Association in Mandalay, one of the most difficult examinations then, and only four of one hundred and fifty candidates passed for that year. Anyone who passes this exam gains the honorific suffix (abhivamsa) so his name Thitila became Thitilabivamsa.

Afterwards he became an abbot of a monastery of three hundred monks. Additionally, he took charge of the education department of the monastery in Yangon established by his teacher Ashin Adiccavamsa.

He also learnt Buddhist scriptures under various scholar monks, both in Mandalay and Yangon. In those days the monastic community and many people who held firmly to conservative views condemned a monk learning English because it was once thought in Myanmar that English was not the academic work for a monk to do. That was why Myanmar monks could not carry out as much work in the stream of Dhamma propagation in the West as those of Sri Lanka or Thailand, due principally to the language barrier. But he started to learn English with great diligence and got to understand English grammar to some extent.

Learning abroad 
He travelled India with the sole purpose of learning Sanskrit and English in 1924. While studying at Shantiniketan University, India, he had to return to Myanmar for his bad health. When he returned, his preceptor Sayadaw Adiccavamsa set off for India and England for further studies. While his teacher was absent, he took charge of the monastery. Six years after his return from India, he planned to go abroad for learning English but this time his choice of country was Ceylon (now Sri Lanka), where he spent two years. Then he moved to Madras (now Chennai), India again around 1934.

It was in Adyar where he was able to learn English from English people. There was a section of Theosophical Society in Adyar, and he made several tries at both becoming its member and staying there for the reason of learning English. Although, at first, he was denied membership in the Society, he got its membership when he was approved by the Yangon branch of the Society. Soon he became the librarian at its library, where he had a chance to learn library science, which was a basic necessity for a large monastery holding tons of books randomly placed on shelves.

During his stay there, he was elected president of the South India Buddhist Associations and contributed much to them.

To brush up on his English and to study the English way of education, especially for children, he went to England in 1938, then he was invited by the secretary of London Buddhist Society to address a sermon on Dhamma, simply the teachings of Buddha. Despite lack of wider knowledge of English when he first arrived in England, his then skill in English was well enough to do the talks to the English audience. Then came his second talk at the Sorbonne University in Paris, entitled ‘World Fellowship Through Buddhism', at the invitation of Sir Francis Younghusband, president and founder of the World Congress of Faiths. After these two talks, he took an English proficiency course at the London Polytechnic.

Second World War 
Unlike the East, the life of a Buddhist monk seemed novel to western communities. Ashin Thittila suffered hardships when the second world war started to spread in London in September 1939. Many people from Myanmar who had come to England for further studies returned to their homeland but Ashin Thittila, being stubborn and having missions to complete for which he had been there, did not make a homeward journey. The war got worse and worse, and he even lost contact with his country, Myanmar. Not a penny was even left to spend on food except for that day's lunch. He saw no way out of the very situation. At last, he swore an oath of fidelity to the Triple Gems: 
I am the one who has a noble purpose and walks in the Truth with dogged determination. By these words of truth, I wish I would get over these troubles.

Soon after his oath, about 11 a.m, a kindly Christian clergyman, one of his acquaintances, came to him and asked him what he needed. When the clergyman knew his difficulties, he took him to the nearby restaurant and offered lunch, then gave shelter in his home. But When the air raids on London were frequent and more heavy, the clergyman, with Ashin Thittila, moved to Somerset, a rural country of England, where he had another large house. He told Ashin Thittila that he could stay there until the end of the war.

Ashin Nyanika, a  learned monk and author of Ashin Thittila's biography, commented on this scene.
A manner of gentleness, a heart of sympathy and an act of empathy are gifts of nature. Serving as members in their respective religious communities, they work with people from all walks of life so the power of their natural spirits gets higher and more mature. When the fact that they are religious service personnel; one is a Christian clergyman and another is a Buddhist monk, is added to this situation, brotherly love has just been developed. A world of difference between the two religions cannot hamper the tie of their friendship 

The house was like a mansion, in which a room was given to him and he would have had a guilty conscience if he had stayed doing nothing so he helped as he could like switching off the lights when bombers were heard, cleaning the compound around the house while observing Buddhist codes of conduct (Vinaya).

He also did voluntary work as a medical attendant for the injured during the war. This kind of social service, a practical form of sympathy and love, is highly praised by every Buddhas so he did very actively by staying at the rural house for about five months.

Social Services 
BBC service in Burmese began in 1940 and it was broadcast only for a quarter of an hour. The service department asked Ashin Thittla for help to report the news in Burmese, where he did the broadcasting for two years.

Although this was not a missionary work for a monk, he took up the duty based on common sense for the love of his nation and people. In May 1946, he participated in compiling the Burmese-English Dictionary led by Dr. Steward, in which project  he worked with Dr. Hla Pe. After the war, he visited people in hospitals, prisons and schools too.

Missionary Work in the West 
When the war ended, he could fulfill his wish to spread the teachings of Buddha. And his talks returned to normal by the arrangement of many supporters. Two separate series of seventeen talks were performed at Workers' Educational Association.

When London Buddhist Society founded in 1924 was restored in 1945 at the end of the war, Mr. Humphreys, president of the society, organized some talks for Ashin Thittila to deliver. Mr. Humphreys wrote about Ashin Thittila :
"The bhikkhu Thittila became of more and more service to the Society, foreshadowing the time when, in September 1947 he would be able to give it whole time, and became one of the leading figures in English Buddhism"

Those talks of Ashin Thittila were only arranged by Mr. Humphreys, which were strictly kept to his schedule. So after some time, the Myanmar audience turned out to be displeased with the arrangements of Mr. Humphreys. To provide shelter and food for the monk, Myanmar Dayakas made an effort to build a monastery but in vain.

Abhidhamma Piṭaka is an eminent characteristic of Ashin Thittila's knowledge of Dhamma. So he introduced it to the West by teaching Abhidhammattha-sangaha, for more than four years in a row, to a group who expressed their interest in Buddhist scriptures, especially in Abhidhamma, of which part they also requested to be taught. As a result, his teaching of Abhidhamma could provide a solid foundation for those who were very enthusiastic about Dhamma.

He was such a patient and skilful teacher and his way of teaching and explanation made his students understand better by giving examples from the Buddhist perspective in order for them to differentiate between religious and philosophical matters, of which they had found it difficult to understand in their traditional way.

It was extremely hard for a Buddhist monk to live in the western countries, especially for a monk without having a shelter in a monastery. For these reasons, a group of nine Myanmar Kappiya (lay manciple) created a monastery called the Sasana Vihara in London to support Ashin Thittila for the sake of convenience. It was the first time he experienced the Eastern way of supporting the Sangha and could also get out of his struggle for survival. But after some time, unfortunately, donations to the Vihara did not even support a monk sufficiently.

According to Mrs. Claudine W. Iggleden, the period of two years (March 1949- March 1951) saw his two hundred and fifty teaching engagements. As he was the only monk living in England at that time, he had many other things to do within the time available to him.

A lecturer on Abhidhamma 
By the year 1952, the University of Yangon aimed  to teach Abhidhamma studies as a philosophical subject, for which purpose it would need a skilful teacher to lecture. In long search of an Abhidhamma lecturer, for which position two striking conditions had to be met; he must have been a citizen of Myanmar and proficient in English language, the patrons of the university at last found Ashin Thittila through some contacts and invited him to take up the post to teach BA and MA students.

U Hla Bu, head of Philosophy Department, raised an objection to the decision to teach Abhidhamma studies in the university, for any university on earth had not taught the subject. But his objection came to nothing because the chancellor and patrons were U Nu, the then prime minister and notable figures of Myanmar, who were Sir U Thwin and U Thein Maung, the Chief Justice of Supreme Court. Dr. Htin Aung, the rector, sent an official invitation letter.

Ashin Thittila at first accepted the appointment for six months or one year but he lectured on the studies in the university till his eighth consecutive year.

A problem as to whether or not he should have been given a salary arose because of his dual role of being a bikkhu and lecturer, in that a bikkhu (Buddhist monk) cannot work like an ordinary person for a living. So the university authorities solved the very problem by donating an appropriate amount of money in the name of 'almsgiving'.

To Europe again 
Two of his English students requested him to visit England to teach Abhidhamma again in 1964. While the subject was being taught, he translated the second part of Abhidhamma Pitaka, Vibhaṅga, which was published, under the title of 'The Book of Analysis', by the Pali Text Society in 1969.

Again in 1982, at the age of 86 or 87, he went to England with Sitagu Sayadaw, both of whom were welcomed by Mrs. Claudine W. Iggleden, the author of his biography sketch in the book, 'Essential Themes of Buddhist Lectures'. She made her home in a village near Reading (about 8 miles) for the stay of Ashin Thittila and two other monks, Ashin Nyanika, who came a month later after them, and Sitagu Sayadaw, both of whom arrived in United Kingdom for the first time. For convenience, she moved to stay at her relative's house because it is strictly restricted for a bikkhu not to share a place with a lady.

He gave some talks in Oxford and Manchester. He did not go very far from the house due to his old age. Still he went to Scotland by plane to preach upon invitation.

Passing away 
At the age of over 100, he died on 3 January 1997 while striving for much Buddhist missionary work both locally and internationally.

Activities on Dhamma

Talks around the world 
When he first reached England in 1938, his very first talk on Dhamma was carried out upon the invitation of Mr. Humphreys, the secretary of the Buddhist Society in London.  His second Dhamma talk, under the title of 'World Fellowship Through Buddhism', occurred at Sorbonne University in Paris, France. After the second world war, he gave a number of talks at Workers' Educational Association and at certain schools, where he was invited to do.

At the invitation of the Association for Asian Studies at the University of Michigan, US, he travelled around the United States in 1959 and gave more than one hundred and sixty lectures at numerous universities and other meetings planned for that purpose, spending six months in the States. In Honolulu University alone, he had to deliver twelve talks, of which ten talks were on Abhidhamma. He then visited Toronto in Canada.

He went to Australia three times after his missionary work in England. In April 1954, for the first time he arrived in Australia and made a talk at Sydney university, where about three hundred students as attendees came to listen with interest. But life is full of things, good and bad. he met both warm welcome and unwelcome remarks and criticism of his arrival to preach. A reporter in The Sun-Herald newspaper wrote :

There were also some good news about his arrival there. 

The second journey to Australia was from 19 May 1956 to 14 June 1956 and the last was from 29 December 1963 to 14 February 1964. He delivered many talks during those three visits.

He toured Japan, where he had a chance to observe Zen Buddhism and meditation techniques and also could discuss with Zen masters. He visited many other Asian countries to do religious work, including Singapore, Hongkong, Indonesia, Cambodia, Nepal, Thailand, and European countries like Belgium, Switzerland, Italy, Germany, Holland. Norway, Sweden and Denmark, and France to give talks upon invitations.

Classes 
In the West, there were two types of groups who were interested in Buddhism in those days :
The first type was those who searched and read many other books on Buddhism to study because they had read certain English translated books on Buddhism and found interesting points in them.
The second was those who came to love Pāli, the medium of sacred texts of Theravāda Buddhism or Southern Buddhism, through learning ancient oriental languages such as Sanskrit and Pāli.

Course on Pali studies 
It is certain that anyone who learns Pāli meets Buddhist texts written in Pāli so one in contact with this language would not be satisfied with the translations. In this way, one may change course  through learning languages to Dhamma studies. To fulfil the above requirement, he gave a course on Pali language.
'A Practical Grammar of the Pali Language' by Charles Duroiselle and 'The new Pali course' by Polwatte Buddhadatta Thera were set as textbooks and Visuddhimagga was also made to be read together with its English translation. He taught the class by dividing a long Pali sentence up into short segments, explaining the rules of grammar, grammatical functions and meanings of texts from Majjhima Nikāya. He also asked his students to read some English translations, in which books he clearly explained to them, pointing out which part of translation was not sufficient to cover the original text, which part was unnecessary, how to make a literal translation and also how to interpret something written in Pali exactly.

In the long run, just learning Pali was not to their satisfaction. Consequently, they requested Ashin Thittila to teach more.

Course on Nikāya 
While he was teaching Pali, he gave a Nikaya course for advanced-level students to take, starting from the Majjhima Nikāya, the collection of middle-length discourses of Buddha Dhamma. Then the Dīgha Nikāya, the collection of long discourses, was lectured. Through those texts, the students could learn social classes, way of life, ritual practises at the time of Buddha. Apart from his students, interested attendees came to study or discuss. Among them, there were some who did not accept the Buddhist concept of Anatta (non-self) or some were Christians who came to the class just for discussion. In teaching those Suttans, he related the subject matter to the Adhidhamma concept in order to make them understand better. The result was that a course on Abhidhamma happened to be given.

Course on Abhidhamma studies 
Ashin Thittila gave a series of lessons on Abhidhamma to his students, who were very enthusiastic about the studies. A few books like 'Abhidhamma Compendium' by U Shwe Zan Aung were set texts and 'A Manual of Abhidhamma' by Bikkhu Narada was the book to read and study. He always told them its background story, event and related subjects before he taught something. He then set the exam to know how much they learnt.

According to Mrs. Iggleden, he, for the first time in the West, taught Abhidhamma systemically for four consecutive years.

Course on meditation 
Some students who learnt under him thought that a theoretical approach to Buddha Dhamma was not enough for them, so they requested him to teach them how to meditate in Theravadin tradition. In response to their request, he taught two types of meditation techniques , namely Samatha (tranquility) and Vipassanā (insight).

Honors 
In 1956, he received a Buddhist honorific title Agga Maha Pandita, which was the only title for outstanding monks annually awarded by the British colonial government from 1915 to 1942. After Myanmar gaining her independence, the government continued this tradition. In the year 1990, the State conferred Abhidhajamahāraṭṭhaguru, one of the highest title, on Ashin Thittila. Another Buddhist missionary title known as Abhidhajaaggamahāsaddhammajotika was bestowed by the government in 1993.

During his stay in Myanmar (1966-1982), he became 'Ovādacariya Sayadaw' (the Elder and adviser) in Sangha Mahanayaka.

He was also a trustee monk of the Shwedagon Pagoda, Sule Pagoda, Kaba Aye Pagoda. He was the examiner of the Abhidhamma Propagation Society in Yangon, too.

Bibliography
The Path of the Buddha for second chapter
The Book of Analysis (Vibhanga)
A Buddhist's Companion: An Exposition and Selected Quotations of Ashin Thittila
Essential Themes of Buddhist Lectures Given by Ashin Thittila
Dhammapada (Pali, Myanmar and English) for part of Myanmar translation

References

Citations

General sources

 (Cited as The Biography of U Thittila)

Theravada Buddhist monks
1896 births
1997 deaths
Burmese Theravada Buddhists
Burmese Buddhist monks
People from Mandalay Region
20th-century Buddhist monks
Burmese recipients of Agga Maha Pandita